Per Olof Berg (born July 17, 1946) is a Swedish organizational theorist and Professor in business administration, known for his work on "Corporate culture and organizational symbolism."

Biography
Born in Strängnäs, Sweden, Berg took an exam as engineer in Industrial Electronics at Västerås Technical Gymnasium. Sequentially he did his military service in Uppsala, and afterwards graduated with an MSc in Business Administration from Lund University in 1970. He defended his PhD thesis in Business Administration at Lund University in 1979.

After his graduation Berg was promoted to Docent at the same university in 1986. He worked at the Department of Business Administration at Lund University from 1971, first as a research assistant, between 1979-1985 as Assistant Professor, and in 1986 he was appointed Associate Professor at the same department. In 1990 he was appointed professor in Strategic Management at Copenhagen Business School (CBS). In Copenhagen he started the research centre Scandinavian Academy of Management (SAMS), and in 1995 he was head of the Department of Management Politics and Philosophy (MPP), at CBS.

In 2000 he was recruited to Stockholm to develop Stockholm School of Entrepreneurship (SSES), which he left in 2005 to become professor in Marketing at Stockholm Business School (SBS) at Stockholm University. He became emeritus in 2013, but was reemployed as senior professor the same year. He is currently head of Stockholm Program of Place Branding (STOPP).

Per Olof Berg has also been visiting professor at INSEAD (Institut Européen d'Administration des Affaires) and ISTUD (Istituto Studi Direzionali), and visiting scholar at Stanford University Business School, UCLA, University of Auckland Business School, University of Technology Sydney,  Università degli Studi di Siena, and Stellenbosch Business School.

Since 1999 Berg is married to professor Guje Sevón, and lives in Strängnäs, Sweden.

Work 
Per Olof Berg has actively contributed to the development of international networks of researchers, among them as chairman of the Standing Conference on Organization Symbolism (SCOS), and as member of the founding board of European Academy of Management (EURAM).

Besides his academic activities, he has been active as strategic advisor to companies, public agencies and non-for profit organizations and as member of boards of consulting companies, media organizations and schools. Since 2021 Berg  is president of the  Swedish Academy of Culinary Art and Meal Science.

Selected publications 
 Berg, P. O. (1979) Emotional Structures in Organizations: A Study of the Process of Change in a Swedish Company, PhD thesis. Lund: Studentlitteratur.  
 Alvesson, M. & Berg, P. O. (1992) Corporate Culture and Organizational Symbolism: An Overview, Berlin: de Gruyter.
 Berg, P.O. & Björner, E. (2014) Branding Chinese Mega Cities: Policies, practices and positioning, Cheltenham, Edvard Elgar Publishing.

Articles, a selection:
 Berg, P. O. (1985) "Organization Change as a Symbolic Transformation Process." In P. J. Frost, L. F. Moore, M. R. Louis, C. C. Lundberg and J. Martin: Organizational Culture, Beverly Hills, CA: Sage.
 Berg, P. O. (1986) "Symbolic Management of Human Resources." Human Resource Management. 25 (4), 557-579. 
 Berg, P. O. (2003) "Magic in Action: Strategic Management in a New Economy." In: Barbara Czarniawska & Guje Sevón. The Northern Lights: Organization Theory in Scandinavia, Malmö: Liber. 
 Lucarelli, A. & Berg, P. O. (2011) City branding: a state-of-the-art review of the research domain,  Journal of Place Management and Development, 4(1), 9-27.

References

External links 
 Per Olof Berg Stockholms universitet, 2014.

1946 births
Living people
Swedish business theorists
Lund University alumni
Academic staff of Stockholm University
People from Strängnäs Municipality